The Laihui Ensemble is a centre for research on traditional and indigenous performing arts, based on Imphal, Manipur. It was established in 1985.
The association is performing different art shows at different venues across different nations in the world. Mangka Mayanglambam is one of the most active artists of the ensemble, and is trying her best to revive the dying art forms of Manipur including the Moirang Sai.

Repertoires

Selected performances 

 Uraolol, an ode to the tree - 2005
 Harao Seigonna Jagoi (Divine dances of love from the Lai Haraoba) - 2005-06
 Ode to the Yaiphabi (Mothers' daughter) Manipuri Music Esplanade - 2006
 Lai Haraoba - 2006
 Lei Langba, Moirang Parva, Traditional musical play - 2006-07
 Songs and Shaman dances of Manipur - 2007
 Ithanglen O! Athouba, Heroes, Heroines and Warriors - 2007-08
 Leishem Thanghai - 2008
 Phou-oibi, the rice goddess - 2009

Other works 

 Pena Phamshak - Men's Ballad
 Moirang Sai - Women's Ballad

Other website 

 http://e-pao.net/epSubPageExtractor.asp?src=reviews.arts.Profile_on_laihui

References 

Meitei culture
Pages with unreviewed translations